Jeffrey Baldwin (January 20, 1997 – November 30, 2002) was a Canadian child whose death from septic shock and bacterial pneumonia after years of mistreatment by his grandparents, Elva Bottineau and Norman Kidman, led to significant changes in policy by children's aid societies in the granting of custody of children to relatives.

Life 

Jeffrey was born in Seattle, Washington, the son of Yvonne Kidman and Richard Baldwin. On April 28, 1998, he and his older sister were taken by the Catholic Children's Aid Society, after allegations of abuse were levelled against their parents. They were given into the custody of their maternal grandparents, Elva Bottineau and Norman Kidman. However, a background check had not been done on the grandparents, and it was later discovered that Elva Bottineau had been previously convicted of child abuse in 1970, after her five-month-old daughter Eva died of pneumonia, and was found to have had numerous fractures.

In 2000, a worker with the Catholic Children's Aid Society noticed a bruise under Jeffrey's eye. However, this was dismissed as an accident, and no further action was taken.

According to later court testimony, Jeffrey and his sister were kept in a locked room at night with furnace vents shut, and when released, were forced to eat with their hands from a mat on the floor. Jeffrey was forbidden from using the bathroom, and as a result, his mattress was covered in dried feces, and his bedroom floor were covered in fecal matter and urine. Despite being forbidden to use a toilet, he would be beaten for defecating in his bedroom. In addition to this rule, Jeffrey was also forced to drink out of the toilet, and he and his sister were forced to eat their own vomit. James Mills, the boyfriend of Jeffrey's aunt who also lived in the house, declared that Jeffrey's grandmother did not love him or his sister, and that they were purely a "dollars and cents" matter, as his grandparents received social assistance for their care.

On the evening of November 30, 2002, the grandparents called 911 to report that Jeffrey was no longer breathing. Upon arrival, emergency workers noticed that his body was "covered in sores, bruises, and abrasions." He had practically no body fat or muscle tone at death, due to possibly years of starvation. His weight at death was 21 pounds (9.5 kg), which was slightly less than his weight at his first birthday, almost five years earlier.

Court case 
On March 19, 2003, the grandparents were arrested and charged with second-degree murder for their role in his death. The court declared they had kept Jeffrey and his sister locked in a bedroom, where he lived in his own feces, and left him to drink from a toilet. The judge was told that the pair used the children as a source of income, collecting government support checks while offering little in return. On April 7, 2006, they were convicted of second-degree murder by Justice David Watt in the Ontario Superior Court of Justice. Sentencing was delivered on June 9, 2006. Bottineau was sentenced to 22 years imprisonment (until 2028) and Kidman 20 years (until 2026), before they respectively become eligible for parole.

Statue 
On November 22, 2013, Todd Boyce, a fellow Canadian unrelated to Jeffrey Baldwin, started a $25,000 crowdfunding campaign on Indiegogo over two months to erect a bronze statue in Greenwood Park, Toronto, depicting Jeffrey dressed as Superman, a superhero he loved. $36,015 was raised. In July 2014, DC Comics denied permission to use the "S" in the Superman logo on the statue. However, the decision was later reversed, and the use of the logo was allowed. The statue was unveiled in the park on October 18, 2014.

See also 
Child abuse
Murder of Sylvia Likens
Murder of Nubia Barahona
Nathaniel Craver
Murder of Victoria Climbié
Death of Lydia Schatz
Nannie Doss - who murdered her two grandsons
 List of child abuse cases featuring long-term detention

References

2002 in Ontario
Deaths by person in Canada
Child abuse resulting in death
2003 in Ontario
2006 in Ontario
2002 murders in Canada
Incidents of violence against boys
Murder in Ontario